Aspartate kinase or aspartokinase (AK) is an enzyme that catalyzes the phosphorylation of the amino acid aspartate. This reaction is the first step in the biosynthesis of three other amino acids: methionine, lysine, and threonine, known as the "aspartate family". Aspartokinases are present only in microorganisms and plants, but not in animals, which must obtain aspartate-family amino acids from their diet. Consequently, methionine, lysine and threonine are essential amino acids in animals.

Nomenclature
The generic abbreviation for aspartokinases is AK. However, the nomenclature for aspartokinase genes and proteins varies considerable among species. The main aspatokinases are lysC (Bacillus subtilis, Escherichia coli and many other bacteria), ask (Mycobacterium bovis, Thermus thermophilus), AK1–AK3 (Arabidopsis thaliana), FUB3 (Fusarium and Gibberella) and HOM3 (Saccharomyces cerevisiae). Additionally, apk is a synonym for lysC.

Enzymatic regulation
Aspartokinases may use the morpheein model of allosteric regulation.

In Escherichia coli, aspartokinase is present as three independently regulated isozymes (thrA, metLM and lysC), each of which is specific to one of the three downstream biochemical pathways. This allows the independent regulation of the rates of methionine, lysine, and threonine production. The forms that produce threonine and lysine are subject to feedback inhibition, and all three can be repressed at the level of gene expression by high concentrations of their end-products. Absence from animals makes these enzymes key targets for new herbicides and biocides and for improvements in nutritional value of crops.

References

External links 
 
 

EC 2.7.2